The Mikoyan-Gurevich MiG-25 (NATO reporting name: Foxbat) is a supersonic interceptor and reconnaissance aircraft that is among the fastest military aircraft to enter service. Designed by the Soviet Union's Mikoyan-Gurevich bureau, it is an aircraft built primarily using stainless steel. It was to be the last plane designed by Mikhail Gurevich, before his retirement.

The first prototype flew in 1964 and the aircraft entered service in 1970. It has an operational top speed of Mach 2.83. Although its thrust was sufficient to reach Mach 3.2+, its speed was limited to prevent engines from overheating at higher air speeds and possibly damaging them beyond repair. When first seen in reconnaissance photography, the large wings suggested an enormous and highly maneuverable fighter, at a time when U.S. design theories were also evolving towards higher maneuverability due to combat performance in the Vietnam War. The appearance of the MiG-25 sparked serious concern in the West and prompted dramatic increases in performance for the McDonnell Douglas F-15 Eagle, then under development in the late 1960s. The capabilities of the MiG-25 were better understood by the West in 1976 when Soviet pilot Viktor Belenko defected in a MiG-25 to the United States via Japan. It turned out that the aircraft's weight necessitated its large wings.

Production of the MiG-25 series ended in 1984 after completion of 1,186 aircraft. A symbol of the Cold War, the MiG-25 flew with Soviet allies and former Soviet republics, remaining in limited service in several export customers. It is one of the highest-flying military aircraft, one of the fastest serially produced interceptor aircraft, and the second-fastest serially produced aircraft after the SR-71 reconnaissance aircraft, which was built in very small series compared to the MiG-25. , the MiG-25 remains the fastest manned serially produced aircraft in operational use and the fastest plane that was offered for supersonic flights and edge-of-space flights to civilian customers.

Design and development

Background
During the Cold War, Soviet Air Defence Forces, PVO (not to be confused with Soviet Air Force, VVS) was given the task of strategic air defence of the USSR. This meant not only dealing with accidental border violations, but more importantly defending the vast airspace of the USSR against US reconnaissance aircraft and strategic bombers carrying free-fall nuclear bombs. The performance of these types of aircraft was steadily improved.  In the late 1950s, the very high altitude overflights of Soviet territory by the Lockheed U-2 revealed the need for a higher altitude interceptor aircraft than available at that time.

The subsonic Boeing B-47 Stratojet and Boeing B-52 Stratofortress strategic bombers were followed by the Mach 2 Convair B-58 Hustler, with the Mach 3 North American B-70 Valkyrie on the drawing board at that time. Mikoyan and Sukhoi responded.

The Mikoyan-Gurevich OKB had been working on a series of interceptors during the second half of the 1950s: the I-1, I-3U, I-7U, I-75, Ye-150, Ye-150A, Ye-152, Ye-152A, Ye-152P, and Ye-152M. The Ye-150 was noteworthy because it was built specifically to test the Tumansky R-15 engine, two of which would later be used for the MiG-25. This led to Ye-152, alternatively known as Ye-166, which set several world records. The Ye-152M (converted from one of the two Ye-152 aircraft) was intended to be the definite heavy interceptor design. But before it was finished, the PVO had selected the Tupolev Tu-128. As the work on the MiG-25 was well under way, the single-engine Ye-152M was abandoned.

Development
Work on the new Soviet interceptor that became the MiG-25 started in mid-1959, a year before Soviet intelligence learned of the American Mach 3 A-12 reconnaissance aircraft. It is not clear if the design was influenced by the American A-5 Vigilante.

The design bureau studied several possible layouts for the new aircraft. One had the engines located side by side, as on the MiG-19. The second had a stepped arrangement with one engine amidships, with exhaust under the fuselage, and another in the aft fuselage. The third project had an engine arrangement similar to that of the English Electric Lightning, with two engines stacked vertically. Options two and three were both rejected because the size of the engines meant that either of them would result in a very tall aircraft, which would complicate maintenance.

The idea of placing the engines in underwing nacelles was also rejected because of the dangers of any thrust asymmetry during flight. Having decided on engine configuration, there was thought of giving the machine variable-sweep wings and a second crew member, a navigator. Variable geometry would improve maneuverability at subsonic speed, but at the cost of decreased fuel tank capacity. Because the reconnaissance aircraft would operate at high speed and high altitude, the idea was soon dropped. Another interesting but impractical idea was to improve the field performance using two RD36-35 lift-jets. Vertical takeoff and landing would allow for use of damaged runways during wartime and was studied on both sides of the Iron Curtain. The perennial problem with engines dedicated to vertical lift is they become mere dead weight in horizontal flight and also occupy space in the airframe needed for fuel. The MiG interceptor would need all the fuel it could get, so the idea was abandoned.

The first prototype was a reconnaissance variant, designated Ye-155-R1, that made its first flight on 6 March 1964. It had some characteristics that were unique to that prototype, and some of these were visually very evident: the wings had fixed wingtip tanks with a  capacity, to which small winglets were attached for stability purposes, but when it was found that fuel sloshing around in the tanks caused vibrations, they were eliminated. The aircraft also had attachments for movable foreplanes, canards, to help with pitch control at high speed (provisions for canards had previously been installed, but not used, on the Ye-152P).

The first flight of the interceptor prototype, Ye-155-P1, took place on 9 September 1964. Development of the MiG-25, which represented a major step forward in Soviet aerodynamics, engineering and metallurgy, took several more years to complete.

On 9 July 1967, the new aircraft was first shown to the public at the Domodedovo air show, with four prototypes (three fighters and a reconnaissance aircraft) making a flypast.

Aviation records
The Mikoyan-Gurevich design bureau soon realized that the performance of the new aircraft gave it great potential to set new flight records. In addition to their normal duties, the prototypes Ye-155-P1, Ye-155-R1, Ye-155-R3 were made lighter by removing some unneeded equipment and were used for these attempts. Under Federation Aeronautique Internationale (FAI) classification, the Ye-155 type belonged to class C1 (III), which specifies jet-powered land planes with unlimited maximum take-off weight. Records set included:
 For pure speed, with no payload, test pilot Mikhail M. Komarov averaged  over a  closed circuit on 5 October 1967.
In the thin air, the engines flamed out, and the aircraft coasted in a ballistic trajectory by inertia alone.
 On 31 August 1977, Ye-266M again flown by Fedotov, set the recognized absolute altitude record for a jet aircraft under its own power. He reached  at Podmoskovnoye, USSR in zoom climb (the absolute altitude record is different from the record for sustained altitude in horizontal flight). The aircraft was actually a MiG-25RB re-engined with the powerful R15BF2-300. It had earlier been part of the program to improve the aircraft's top speed that resulted in the MiG-25M prototype.

Several records still stand.

Technical description
Because of the thermal stresses incurred in flight above Mach 2, the Mikoyan-Gurevich OKB had difficulties choosing what materials to use for the aircraft. They had to use E-2 heat-resistant Plexiglas for the canopy and high-strength stainless steel for the wings and fuselage. Using titanium rather than steel would have been ideal, but it was expensive and difficult to work with. The problem of cracks in welded titanium structures with thin walls could not be solved, so the heavier nickel steel was used instead.  It cost far less than titanium and allowed for welding, along with heat-resistant seals. The MiG-25 was constructed from 80% nickel-steel alloy, 11% aluminium, and 9% titanium. The steel components were formed by a combination of spot welding, automatic machine welding, and hand arc welding methods.

Initially, the interceptor version was equipped with the TL-25 Smerch-A (also referred to as Product 720) radar, a development of the system carried by the earlier Tu-128. While powerful and thus long-ranged and resistant to jamming, the system—due to the age of its design and its intended purpose (tracking and targeting high- and fast-flying US bombers and reconnaissance aircraft)—lacked look-down/shoot-down capability, which limited its effectiveness against low-flying targets. (This is one of the reasons why it was replaced with the Mikoyan-Gurevich MiG-31, whose Zaslon radar has that capability.) By the time the MiG-25 entered service in 1969, this was a serious shortcoming, as strategic bombing doctrine was shifting towards low-level penetration of enemy territory. After Belenko's defection to Japan exposed this flaw to the West, a government decree issued on 4 November 1976 called for urgent development of a more advanced radar. This resulted in the pulse-Doppler radar Sapphire-25 system fitted to the MiG-25PD variant.

As an interceptor, typical armament includes four R-40 long-range air-to-air missiles, each fitted with either an infrared seeker (R-40T/TD) or a semi-active radar homing seeker (R-40R/RD) and a maximum range of  against a high-flying target on a collision course. A fuel tank could be suspended under the fuselage. The aircraft could carry unguided gravity bombs to fulfill a rudimentary strike role.

Its high speed was problematic: although sufficient thrust was available to reach Mach 3.2, a limit of Mach 2.83 had to be imposed as the engines tended to overspeed and overheat at higher air speeds, possibly damaging them beyond repair.

The design cruising speed is Mach 2.35 (2,500 km/h) with partial afterburner in operation. The maximum speed of Mach 2.83 (3,000 km/h) is allowed to maintain no more than 5 minutes due to the danger of overheating of the airframe and fuel in the tanks. When the airframe temperature reaches , the warning lamp lights up, and the pilot must reduce airspeed. The use of a partial afterburner and a cruising flight altitude  makes it possible to have a range only  less than when flying Mach 0.9 at altitudes . The poor fuel consumption in the subsonic regime, and hence range, is due to the engines having extremely low pressure ratio of just 4.75 at subsonic speeds. The specific fuel consumption (SFC) of the engines is 1.12lb/(h·lbf) in cruise and 2.45lb/(h·lbf) with afterburners. For comparison purposes, this is 50% worse in cruise than the first generation of F100 engines from the F-15 Eagle, but the SFC with afterburners is actually nearly equal, despite the F100 being a far newer engine design.

Production

Full-scale production of the MiG-25R ("Foxbat-B") began in 1969 at the Gorkii aircraft factory (Plant No. 21). The MiG-25P ("Foxbat-A") followed in 1971, and 460 of this variant were built until production ended in 1982. The improved PD variant that replaced it was built from 1978 till 1984, with 104 aircraft completed. Subsequently the Gorkii factory switched over production to the new MiG-31.

Western intelligence and the MiG-25

Inaccurate intelligence analysis caused the West initially to believe the MiG-25 was an agile air-combat fighter rather than an interceptor. In response, the United States started a new program, which resulted in the McDonnell Douglas F-15 Eagle. NATO obtained a better understanding of the MiG-25's capabilities on 6 September 1976, when a Soviet Air Defence Forces pilot, Lt. Viktor Belenko, defected, landing his MiG-25P at Hakodate Airport in Japan. The pilot overshot the runway on landing and damaged the front landing gear. Despite Soviet protests, the Japanese invited U.S. Air Force personnel to investigate the aircraft. On 25 September, it was moved by a C-5A transport to a base in central Japan, where it was carefully dismantled and analyzed. After 67 days, the aircraft was returned by ship to the Soviets, in pieces. The aircraft was reassembled and is now on display at the Sokol plant in Nizhny Novgorod.

The analysis, based on technical manuals and ground tests of its engines and avionics, revealed unusual technical information:
 Belenko's particular aircraft was brand new, representing the latest Soviet technology.
 The aircraft was assembled quickly and was essentially built around its massive Tumansky R-15(B) turbojets.
 Welding was done by hand. Rivets with non-flush heads were used in areas that would not cause adverse aerodynamic drag.
 The aircraft was built of a nickel-steel alloy and not titanium, as was assumed (although some titanium was used in heat-critical areas). The steel construction contributed to the craft's high  unarmed weight.
 Maximum acceleration (g-load) rating was just 2.2 g (21.6 m/s2) with full fuel tanks, with an absolute limit of 4.5 g (44.1 m/s2). One MiG-25 withstood an inadvertent 11.5 g (112.8 m/s2) pull during low-altitude dogfight training, but the resulting deformation damaged the airframe beyond repair.
 The airspeed indicator was redlined at Mach 2.8, with typical intercept speeds near Mach 2.5 in order to extend the service life of the engines. A MiG-25 was tracked flying over the Sinai Peninsula at Mach 3.2 in the early 1970s, but the flight led to the engines being damaged beyond repair.
 The majority of the on-board avionics were based on vacuum-tube technology, more specifically nuvistors, not solid-state electronics. Although they represented aging technology, vacuum tubes were more tolerant of temperature extremes, thereby removing the need for environmental controls in the avionics bays. With the use of vacuum tubes, the MiG-25P's original Smerch-A (Tornado, NATO reporting name "Foxfire") radar had enormous power, about 600 kilowatts. As with most Soviet aircraft, the MiG-25 was designed to be as robust as possible. The use of vacuum tubes also made the aircraft's systems resistant to an electromagnetic pulse, for example, after a nuclear blast. They were also presumably used to provide radiation hardening for the avionics.

Later versions
As the result of Belenko's defection and the compromise of the MiG-25P's radar and missile systems, beginning in 1976, the Soviets started to develop an advanced version, the MiG-25PD ("Foxbat-E").

Plans for a new aircraft to develop the MiG-25's potential to go faster than the in-service limit of Mach 2.8 were designed as a flying prototype. Unofficially designated MiG-25M, it had new powerful engines R15BF2-300, improved radar, and missiles. This work never resulted in a machine for series production, as the coming MiG-31 showed more promise.

Operational history

Soviet Union

The unarmed 'B' version had greater impact than the interceptor when the USSR sent two MiG-25R and two MiG-25RB to Egypt in March 1971, which stayed until July 1972. They were operated by the Soviet 63rd Independent Air Detachment (Det 63), which was established for this mission. Det 63 flew over Israeli-held territory in Sinai on reconnaissance missions roughly 20 times. On 6 November 1971, a Soviet MiG-25 operating out of Egypt flying at Mach 2.5 was met by Israeli F-4Es and fired upon unsuccessfully. A MiG-25 was tracked flying over Sinai at Mach 3.2 during this period. The MiG-25 engines went into overspeed, which led to them being scrapped. Det 63 was sent back home in 1972. Soviet-operated reconnaissance Foxbats returned to Egypt in 19–20 October 1973, during the Yom Kippur War. Det 154 remained in Egypt until late 1974.

During the 1970s, the Soviet air force conducted reconnaissance overflights across Iran using its MiG-25RBSh aircraft in response to joint US-Iran recon operations.

Syria
On 13 February 1981, the Israeli Air Force sent two RF-4Es over Lebanon as decoys for Syrian MiG-25 interceptors. As the MiGs scrambled, the RF-4Es turned back delivering chaff and using ECM pods. Two IDF/AF F-15As were waiting for the MiGs and shot one of them down with AIM-7F Sparrow missiles. The other MiG was able to escape. In a similar engagement, on 29 July 1981, a Syrian MiG-25 was again downed by an Israeli F-15A, after which a second MiG-25 launched its R-40 missiles at the F-15 and its wingman, but they missed.

The first reported activity of Syrian MiG-25 aircraft in the civil war was on 8 February 2014, when two Turkish Air Force F-16s were scrambled to intercept a Syrian MiG-25 which was approaching the Turkish border.

Iraq

Iran–Iraq War

All confirmed air-to-air kills by the MiG-25 were made by Iraq.

The MiG-25 was in service with the Iraqi Air Force during the Iran–Iraq War. Iraqi claimed their MiG-25s shot down at least 15 Iranian aircraft during the war, while only one MiG-25 was lost in air combat (one more lost by SAM)

 On 19 March 1982, an Iranian F-4E was badly damaged by a missile fired by an Iraqi MiG-25.
 24 November 1982 an Iraqi MiG-25PD over Eivan shot down an Iranian F-5F.
 In December 1982, an Iraqi MiG-25PD over Baghdad shot down an Iranian F-5E.
 Iraqi MiG-25s made another kill against Iran in February 1983, when an Iraqi MiG-25PD shot down an Iranian C-130.
 In April 1984, an Iraqi MiG-25PD shot down an Iranian F-5E.
 On 21 March 1985, an Iraqi MiG-25PD shot down an Iranian F-4E (Iranian pilots Hossein Khalatbari and Mohhamad Zadeh were killed).
 5 June 1985 an Iraqi MiG-25PD shot down a second Iranian F-4E.
 17 February 1986 an Iraqi MiG-25PD shot down an Iranian Fokker F-27, all 53 people, crew and high ranked officers were killed.
 On 23 February 1986, an Iraqi MiG-25PD shot down an Iranian EC-130E.
 10 June 1986 an Iraqi MiG-25PD shot down an Iranian RF-4E.
 In October 1986, an Iraqi MiG-25PDS shot down a second RF-4E.
 On 17 January 1987, an Iraqi MiG-25PDS shot down an Iranian F-14A with an R-40 missile. Iranian pilot Major Bahram Ghaneie was rescued, operator Lieutenant Reza Vadtalab was killed. For a long time it was believed that this air victory was won by a MiG-23ML.

The most successful Iraqi MiG-25 pilot of the war was Colonel Mohommed Rayyan, who was credited with ten kills.  Eight of these were while flying the MiG-25PD from 1981 to 1986.  In 1986, after attaining the rank of Colonel, Rayyan was shot down and killed by Iranian F-14s. For the majority of the air combat Iraqi pilots used R-40 missiles.

 On 3 May 1981, an Iraqi MiG-25PD shot down an Algerian Gulfstream II.
 On 2 October 1986, an Iraqi MiG-25PD shot down a Syrian MiG-21RF.

According to research by journalist Tom Cooper, Iranian claimed ten MiG-25s (nine reconnaissance and one fighter) may have been shot down by Iranian F-14s (one of them shared with an F-5) during the Iran-Iraq war. Only three MiG-25 losses (to ground fire or air combat) were confirmed by Iraq.

Confirmed MiG-25 combat losses during Iran-Iraq war:
 June 1983 an Iraqi MiG-25R piloted by Colonel Abdullah Faraj Mohammad was shot down by an Iranian fighter jet F-14A.
 25 February 1987 an Iraqi MiG-25RB piloted by Lieutenant Sayer Sobhi Ahmad was shot down by an Iranian SAM HQ-2, pilot was captured.

Persian Gulf War

During the Persian Gulf War, a U.S. Navy F/A-18, piloted by Lt Cdr Scott Speicher, was shot down on the first night of the war by a missile fired by a MiG-25. The kill was reportedly made with a Bisnovat R-40TD missile fired from a MiG-25PDS flown by Lt. Zuhair Dawood of the 84th squadron of the IQAF,

Two IQAF MiG-25s were shot down by U.S. Air Force F-15s on 19 January. The MiGs attempted to hide from the F-15s by using chaff and electronic jammers in order to engage the F-15s untargeted. However the F-15 pilots were able to reacquire the two Iraqi MiG-25s and shot both down with AIM-7 Sparrow missiles. In another incident, an Iraqi MiG-25PD, after eluding eight USAF F-15s at long range, fired three missiles at General Dynamics EF-111A Raven electronic warfare aircraft, forcing them to abort their mission and leave attacking aircraft without electronic jamming support.

In a different incident, two MiG-25s approached a pair of F-15s, fired missiles at long range which were evaded by the F-15s, and then outran the American fighters. Two more F-15s joined the pursuit, and a total of 10 air-to-air missiles were fired at the MiG-25s, though none reached them.

On 30 January 1991, an IQAF MiG-25 damaged a USAF F-15C by a R-40 missile in the Samurra Air Battle. Iraq claims it was shot down and fell in Saudi Arabia.

After the war, on 27 December 1992, a U.S. F-16D downed an IQAF MiG-25 that violated the no-fly zone in southern Iraq with an AIM-120 AMRAAM missile. It was the first USAF F-16 air-to-air victory and the first AMRAAM kill.

On 23 December 2002, an Iraqi MiG-25 shot down a U.S. Air Force unmanned MQ-1 Predator drone, which was performing armed reconnaissance over Iraq. This was the first time in history that an aircraft and an unmanned drone had engaged in combat. Predators had been armed with AIM-92 Stinger air-to-air missiles and were being used to "bait" Iraqi fighter aircraft, then run. In this incident, the Predator did not run, but instead fired one of the Stingers, which missed, while the MiG's missile did not.

No Iraqi aircraft were deployed in the U.S. invasion of Iraq in 2003, with most Iraqi aircraft being hidden or destroyed on the ground. In August 2003, several dozen Iraqi aircraft were discovered buried in the sand.

India

The MiG-25 was kept a guarded secret in India, designated Garuda after the large mythical bird of Vishnu from Hindu scriptures. It was used extensively in the Kargil War and Operation Parakram, conducting aerial reconnaissance sorties over Pakistan.

In May 1997, an Indian Air Force Mikoyan MiG-25RB reconnaissance aircraft created a furor when the pilot flew faster than Mach 3 over Pakistani territory following a reconnaissance mission into Pakistan airspace. The Pakistani Government contended that the breaking of the sound barrier was a deliberate attempt to make the point that the Pakistan Air Force (PAF) had no aircraft in its inventory that could come close to the MiG-25's cruising altitude (up to ). India denied the incident but Pakistan's Foreign Minister, Gohar Ayub Khan, believed that the Foxbat photographed strategic installations near the capital, Islamabad.

Lack of spare parts and India's acquisition of unmanned aerial vehicles and satellite imagery eventually led to its retirement in 2006.

Libya

Libya was a major user of the MiG-25 as it imported 96 MiG-25PD interceptor, MiG-25PU trainer and MiG-25RBK reconnaissance aircraft in the late 1970s and early 1980s.

During the 1980s, Libya confronted the United States over some claims over the extension of its territorial waters. These incidents prompted a number of encounters between the opposing forces as it happened during the Gulf of Sidra incident (1981) with the Libyan MiG-25s taking part in them.

During the following years, the Libyan MiG-25 fleet was grounded, lacking maintenance. As MiG-25s had been grounded for several years, NATO attacks spared them during the Libyan Civil War (2011).

In 2014 and 2015, the Libyan forces under the New General National Congress controlled a number of former LARAF airframes, that were retired and stored before the Libyan Civil War in 2011, among them a number of MiG-25s. Technicians started working on some of the airframes to press them back to service in the fight against the opposing internationally recognized Libyan government forces.

On 6 May 2015, a New General National Congress MiG-25PU crashed near Zintan while attacking the civilian airport controlled by the opposing internationally recognized Libyan government, the pilot ejected and was captured by opposing forces which also claimed they downed the jet. The jet may have been on one of its first flights after re-entering service.

Variants

Prototypes
Ye-155R
 Reconnaissance prototypes. Two prototypes (Ye-155R-1 and Ye-155R-2) followed by four pre-production aircraft fitted with reconnaissance equipment.
Ye-155P
 Interceptor fighter prototypes. Two prototypes (Ye-155P-1 and Ye-155P02) followed by nine pre-production aircraft.
Ye-266
 Designation applied to prototypes and pre-production aircraft (Ye-155R-1, Ye-155R-3 and Ye-155P-1) used for record breaking purposes in official documentation supplied to the Fédération Aéronautique Internationale.

Interceptors
MiG-25P
 Single-seat all-weather interceptor fighter aircraft, powered by two Tumansky R-15B-300 turbojet engines, fitted with RP-25 Smerch-A1 radar and armed with four R-40 air-to-air missiles. NATO designation Foxbat-A.
MiG-25PD
 Improved single-seat all-weather interceptor fighter aircraft, which entered service from 1979. Fitted with R-15BD-300 engines and new N-005 Saphir-25 (RP-25M) Pulse-Doppler radar with look-down/shoot down capability, based on the radar of the MiG-23ML. Could be fitted with four R-60 air-to-air missiles replacing outermost two R-40 missiles. Late examples fitted with an undernose IRST. NATO designation Foxbat-E.
MiG-25PDS
 Upgrade of surviving MiG-25Ps to MiG-25PD standard from 1979. NATO designation Foxbat-E.
MiG-25PDSL
Single MiG-25PD modified by addition of electronic countermeasures (ECM) equipment.
MiG-25PDZ
Single MiG-25PD modified with retractable in-flight refuelling probe.
MiG-25M
Two testbeds (one converted from a MiG-25RB and one from a MiG-25PD) for more powerful ( dry,  with afterburner) engines.
Ye-266M
Izdelye 99
 Two aircraft used as testbeds for Soloviev D-30F turbofan as later used in MiG-31.

Reconnaissance and strike versions

MiG-25R
 Single-seat high-altitude daylight reconnaissance aircraft, fitted with cameras and ELINT equipment. NATO codename Foxbat-B.
MiG-25RB
 Single-seat reconnaissance-bomber derivative of MiG-25R, fitted with improved reconnaissance systems and a Peleng automatic bombing system. The aircraft can carry a bombload of eight  bombs. Entered service in 1970. NATO codename Foxbat-B.
MiG-25RBV
 Modernised single-seat reconnaissance-bomber with revised ELINT equipment (SRS-9 Virazh). NATO codename Foxbat-B.
MiG-25RBT
 Further improved reconnaissance-bomber, with Tangazh ELINT equipment. NATO codename Foxbat-B.
MiG-25RBN
Dedicated night reconnaissance aircraft, carrying 10 photoflash bombs under the fuselage. Only single prototype built. NATO codename Foxbat-B.
MiG-25RR
 Conversion of eight reconnaissance aircraft for high-altitude radiation sampling role. Used to monitor Chinese nuclear tests between 1970 and 1980. NATO codename Foxbat-B.
MiG-25RBK
 Single-seat dedicated ELINT aircraft, with Kub-3K ELINT system. Bombing capability retained but cameras not fitted. NATO codename Foxbat-D.
MiG-25RBF
 Conversion of MiG-25RBK with new Shar-25 ELINT equipment. NATO codename Foxbat-D.
MiG-25RBS
 Single-seat radar-reconnaissance aircraft, with Sablya-E side looking airborne radar (SLAR). Cameras not fitted but bombing capability retained. NATO codename Foxbat-D.
MiG-25RBSh
 MiG-25RBS fitted with more capable Shompol SLAR. NATO codename Foxbat-D.
MiG-25BM "Foxbat-F" Single-seat defence-suppression aircraft, armed with Kh-58 or Kh-31 air-to-surface missiles.

Conversion trainers

MiG-25PU
 Two-seat conversion trainer for MiG-25P interceptors. Fitted with a new nose section with two separate cockpits. It has no radar and no combat capability. NATO codename Foxbat-C.
MiG-25RU
 Two-seat conversion trainer for reconnaissance versions. Fitted with MiG-25R navigation system. NATO codename Foxbat-C.
Ye-133

Operators

Syrian Air Force – 2 MiG-25Rs in service as of December 2022; 16 MiG-25PDs, 8 MiG-25RBs and 2 MiG-25PUs trainers were received.

Former operators

Algerian Air Force – Was the last operator to the MiG-25 before retiring.

Armenian Air Force

Bulgarian Air Force – Three MiG-25RBTs (#731, #736 and #754) and one MiG-25RU (#51) aircraft were delivered in 1982. On 12 April 1984, #736 crashed near Balchik Airfield. The pilot ejected successfully. They were operated by the 26th Reconnaissance Aviation Regiment at Tolbukhin Airfield (today Dobrich) until their withdrawal. In May 1991, the surviving MiG-25s were returned to the USSR in exchange for five MiG-23MLDs.

Belarus Air Force – Had up to 50 MiG-25s, including 13 MiG-25PDs; by 1995 the type had been withdrawn.

Indian Air Force – Took delivery of six MiG-25RBKs and two MiG-25RUs in 1981. They were operated by No. 102 Squadron "Trisonics" based at Bakshi Ka Talab AB in Lucknow, Uttar Pradesh. One RBK crashed on 3 August 1994. Retired from service in May 2006.

Iraqi Air Force – Had seven MiG-25PUs, nine MiG-25RBs, and 19 MiG-25PD/PDSs as of January 1991. During the Gulf War (Operation Desert Storm) most of them were destroyed on the ground, two were shot down and seven were flown over to Iran.

Georgian Air Force

Libyan Air Force – Once operated a large number of MiG-25s.

Russian Air Force

Soviet Air Forces and Soviet Air Defence Forces – The largest combined operator historically. Soviet aircraft were passed on to its successor states in 1991.

Military of Turkmenistan

Ukrainian Air Force – Took over 79 aircraft after the breakup of the USSR. They have been withdrawn from service.

Aircraft on display
 MiG-25PD Red 49 (c/n N84008895) is on display at the Central Armed Forces Museum, Moscow, Russia.
 MiG-25RB (s/n 25105) is in the restoration facility at the National Museum of the United States Air Force in Dayton, Ohio, US. The aircraft had been buried to prevent its destruction on the ground by coalition aircraft. When uncovered, the MiG-25RB was incomplete, as the wings could not be located. This aircraft was one of two MiG-25s transported by a Lockheed C-5A Galaxy from Iraq to Wright-Patterson Air Force Base for examination. It was donated to the National Museum of the United States Air Force in December 2006. The museum's restoration staff is currently attempting to locate a set of wings to complete the aircraft for display.
 MiG-25R (s/n KP355) is on display at the Indian Air Force Museum at Palam, New Delhi, another at National Defence Academy (India), Khadakwasla, Pune (Maharashtra), and two MiG-25U trainers (s/n DS361 and DS362) are preserved at Kalaikunda Air Force Station in the Midnapore District of West Bengal, India.
 MiG-25RBSh was bought by Estonian Aviation Museum in 2016 from a private owner in Finland, who had purchased it from Russia after the dissolution of Soviet Union. The aircraft is displayed as part of the museum's exposition in Tartumaa, Estonia since June 2016.

Specifications (MiG-25P / MiG-25PD)

See also

References
Notes

Citations

Bibliography

 Aloni, Shlomo. Israeli F-15 Eagle Units in Combat. Oxford: Osprey Publishing, 2006. .
 Atkinson, Rick. Crusade: The Untold History of the Persian Gulf War. New York: Houghton Mifflin Company, 1993. .
 Barron, John. MiG Pilot: The Final Escape of Lt. Belenko. New York: McGraw-Hill, 1980. .
 Belyakov, R.A. and J. Marmain. MiG: Fifty Years of Secret Aircraft Design. Shrewsbury, UK: Airlife Publishing, 1994. .
 Bhonsle, Brig. Rahul K. India: Security Scope 2006 The New Great Game. Delhi, India: Kalpaz Publications, 2006. .
 Cooper, Tom and Farzad Bishop. Iranian F-14 Units in Combat. London: Osprey Publishing, 2004. .
 Davies, Steve. Combat Legend, F-15 Eagle and Strike Eagle. London: Airlife Publishing, Ltd., 2002. .
 Eden, Paul, ed. "Mikoyan MiG-25 'Foxbat'". "Mikoyan MiG-31 'Foxhound'". Encyclopedia of Modern Military Aircraft. London: Amber Books, 2004. .
 Frawley, Gerald. "Mikoyan MiG-25." The International Directory of Military Aircraft, 2002/2003. Fyshwick, ACT, Australia: Aerospace Publications, 2002. .
 Gordon, Yefim. MiG-25 'Foxbat' & MiG-31 'Foxhound': Russia's Defensive Front Line. Leicester, UK: Midland Publishing Ltd., 1997. .
 Gordon, Yefim. Mikoyan MiG-25 Foxbat: Guardian of the Soviet Borders (Red Star Vol. 34). Hinckley, UK: Midland Publishing Ltd., 2008. .
 Gordon, Yefim and Bill Gunston. Soviet X-Planes. Earl Shilton, Leicester, UK: Midland Publishing Ltd., 2000. .
 Green, William and Gordon Swanborough. The Great Book of Fighters. St. Paul, Minnesota: Motorbooks International Publishing, 2001. .
 Gunston, Bill. An Illustrated Guide to Modern Fighters and Attack Aircraft. London: Salamander Books, 1980. .
 Gunston, Bill and Mike Spick. "Mikoyan/Gurevich MiG-25." Modern Air Combat: The Aircraft, Tactics and Weapons Employed in Aerial Combat Today. New York: Crescent Books, 1983. .
 Hoyle, Craig. "World Air Forces". Flight International, Vol. 188, No. 5517, 8–14 December 2015. pp. 22–53. .
 Hoyle, Craig. "World Air Forces Directory". Flight International, Vol. 190, No. 5566, 6–12 December 2016. pp. 26–53. .
 Jenkins, Dennis R. McDonnell Douglas F-15 Eagle: Supreme Heavy-Weight Fighter. Hinckley, UK: Midland Publishing, 1998. .
 Lake, Jon. "Variant Briefing: MiG-25 'Foxbat' and MiG-31 'Foxhound'". World Air Power Journal, Volume 34, Autumn/Fall 1998, pp. 98–123. London: Aerospace Publishing. . ISSN 0959-7050.
 Nicolle, David and Tom Cooper. Arab MiG-19 and MiG-21 Units in Combat (Osprey Combat Aircraft 044). Oxford, UK: Osprey Publishing, 2004. .
 Rich, Ben and Leo Janos. Skunk Works: A Personal Memoir of My Years of Lockheed. New York: Little, Brown & Company, 1994. .
 Spick, Mike. The Great Book of Modern Warplanes. St. Paul, Minnesota: Motorbooks International Publishing, 2000. .
 Wilson, Stewart. Combat Aircraft since 1945. Fyshwick, Australia: Aerospace Publications, 2000. .

External links

MiG-25 page on GlobalSecurity.org
MiG-25/31 at Greg Goebel's Air Vectors site
Foxbat and Foxhound – Australian Aviation
Recce Incursion – Famous incident of IAF MiG-25 intruding into Pakistan airspace

MiG-025
1960s Soviet fighter aircraft
1960s Soviet military reconnaissance aircraft
Twinjets
High-wing aircraft
Aircraft first flown in 1964